Scioto Lounge, or the Scioto Lounge deer sculptures, is a series of three bronze sculptures depicting anthropomorphic deer by Terry Allen, installed in Columbus, Ohio, United States. Two of the sculptures are installed in Genoa Park, and a third is installed on the Rich Street Bridge. The pieces were installed in 2014.

See also

 2014 in art

References

External links
 
 

2014 establishments in Ohio
2014 sculptures
Animal sculptures in the United States
Bronze sculptures in Ohio
Deer in art
Franklinton (Columbus, Ohio)
Outdoor sculptures in Columbus, Ohio
Statues in Columbus, Ohio